is a railway station in Ōta, Tokyo, Japan, operated by the private railway operator Tokyu Corporation.

Lines
Den-en-chōfu Station is served by the Tokyu Toyoko Line and Tokyu Meguro Line. It is roughly a 15-minute train journey from Shibuya Station.

Station layout
This station consists of two island platforms serving four tracks.

Platforms

History
The station opened on 28 August 1927.

Surrounding area
The station is situated in Den-en-chōfu, within the Ōta ward of suburban Tokyo. This was one of the original garden suburbs of Tokyo, running along the Tama River. The design of the town was heavily influenced by Sir Ebenezer Howard's Garden Cities of To-morrow (London 1898/1902). The original 1920s station building was torn down in the late 1980s to make way for the new modern station building. In a nod to its past and in order to retain its unique identity, a copy of the original building was constructed on elevated ground and now acts as an entranceway to the plaza in front of the subway station entrance.

References

External links

 Station information (Tokyu) 

Tokyu Toyoko Line
Tokyu Meguro Line
Stations of Tokyu Corporation
Railway stations in Tokyo
Railway stations in Japan opened in 1927